The Upstage Gallery features artists from Topeka, Kansas and the surrounding areas since February 2007. The gallery is located in the future lobby of the Jayhawk State Theatre of Kansas. The Jayhawk will include a gallery space and museum in its reconstruction and The Upstage Gallery furthers the Jayhawk mission statement in this regard.

References

External links
The Upstage Gallery
Official Jayhawk Theatre website

Buildings and structures in Topeka, Kansas
Tourist attractions in Topeka, Kansas
Art museums and galleries in Kansas
Art galleries established in 2007
2007 establishments in Kansas